The teen edition of Pinoy Big Brother: Kumunity Season 10 premiered on Kapamilya Channel, Jeepney TV and A2Z on March 13, 2022. The third edition in the multi-part season, this edition featured contestants (known as Housemates) from the Teen Kumunity, which composes of civilians aged fifteen through nineteen.

The edition concluded on May 14, 2022 after 63 days. Rob Blackburn and Gabb Skribikin emerged as the Teen Top 2, advancing to the final part of the season.

Production

Housemate selection
Just like the previous edition, online auditions were also held for this edition. It was initially scheduled to open on December 1, 2021, but was moved to November 6 during the Celebrity Edition's first eviction episode as an early Christmas treat to the show's teenage viewers.

Online Bahay ni Kuya
Unlike the previous edition that had three winners, only one spot was given to the aspiring teen housemates that auditioned online via Kumu. The Online Bahay ni Kuya Kumu campaign was held from March 11–12, 2022 where John Paolo Alcantara emerged as the winner of the campaign and therefore was declared an official teen housemate.

Overview

Title card change
A new title card was included in both this edition and the preceding edition. On the back is a blue neon-colored house with the seasons' logo on the front, now displaying the words "Teen Edition" on the bottom of the seasons' logo. This was the only edition to display the editions' name to differentiate it from the other editions. Additionally, the entire title card for this edition has a neon summer background.

The House
The interiors of the houses were largely left alone, much like the previous edition. The only difference was that instead of showing Pinoy Ako, some of the neon lightings now display some of the lines of the edition's theme song, Kabataang Pinoy.

Theme songs
The theme song for this edition came in two different versions; one was performed by the independent musical group Nameless Kids and was solely intended for promotional use. The latter was abandoned in favor of SB19 and BINI working together on the same theme song.

The eviction theme song for this edition is entitled Dalampasigan by celebrity housemate and finalist Anji Salvacion.

Twists
 Outside World Destination — Last used in Otso, instead of entering the House immediately, the Teen housemates were sent into a remote location up in the mountains and were divided into two groups. They must complete a series of tasks and challenges given by Big Brother to grant them access into the House.
 K.E.A (Kuya's Executive Assistant) — During the Teen Edition, Big Brother announced to his teen housemates that he'll leave the house temporarily for an undisclosed reason. In connection to this, he introduced his savvy virtual assistant named K.E.A (short for Kuya's Executive Assistant) that the housemates can communicate with her on a separate room. Unbeknownst to the Teen housemates, K.E.A was "hacked" by a scammer by catfishing the housemates. This gave them and the viewers a valuable lesson regarding social media fraud.
 Kuya's Task Master — Similar to Kuya's Christmas Elf, the Teen Edition featured a task master in which the winner of this campaign on Kumu will distribute tasks and messages in behalf of Big Brother virtually or in person. Hiroshi Aruelo won this campaign and appeared virtually on May 5 to explain the Plate Balancing weekly task.
 The Ten Million Diamonds Group Challenge — This edition featured the Teen housemates competing against a group of Teen houseplayers to get a portion of the ten million diamonds on two group challenges.

Housemates
The edition's first three housemates were introduced at the show's online companion show, PBB Kumulitan, on March 7, 2022. The rest of the housemates were introduced in pairs throughout the rest of the week. The final two housemates —Paolo Alcantara, the winner of the last Online Bahay ni Kuya campaign and Stephanie Jordan were revealed nine days later on March 16.

Notes
  Gabb and Rob did not leave the house when they were declared as the Top Two winners. They were then joined by the Kumunity Top Twos and the wildcard housemates the next day.
  Stephanie and Maxine did not completely leave the house due to the wildcard housemates twist announced to them by Big Brother, but they were still considered as the last two evictees of the edition. They would return to the house and compete as individual wildcard housemates for a spot at the Biga-10 housemates.

Houseplayers 
Turning over from the previous edition, another campaign for the Teen Edition was held on April 2 until April 8, 2022. Out of the top ten diamond earners, only three of them will be selected as the official houseplayers for the Teen Edition—they will play as a group to challenge the housemates through a series of tasks given by Big Brother. The seven unchosen earners will instead have their respective co-host slots in PBB Kumulitan and will receive exclusive merch from Kumu. They will also undergo screening first with the production team of the show similar to the previous edition's campaign.

David Charles Longinotti, Erica Dimaculangan, and Lyanna Ong Fontanilla were selected to become the teen houseplayers for the Teen edition. They were first introduced on PBB Kumulitan during the sixth live eviction night on May 8 before the three of them entered the house the next day.

With the houseplayers successfully stealing the housemates' 7 million diamonds out of the possible 10 in the Ten Million Diamonds Group Challenge, they have proved that teamwork, determination, and patience is the key when it comes to Big Brother's tasks.

All of them have formed friendships with the Teen housemates almost immediately after the "camp masters" (what the housemates called them during the time of their stay) revealed their true status to the Teen housemates on Day 209. They exited the house minutes after their announcement after a short bonding with each other.

Campaign results

Houseguests

Online Guesting 
 Day 178: John Bradley "Jan-Jan" Ronato, Tiff's autistic brother, got to spend time with Tiff and the housemates through Zoom in occupational therapy and mathematics sessions as part of her sacrifice task.
 Day 184: As a response to the widely criticized History Quiz Bee, historian Xiao Chua was invited to help Big Brother in re-educating the housemates in learning Philippine history as part of their History Week task.
 Day 196: Lilibeth and Simon Alford, Luke's parents, appeared virtually on Zoom to have a talk with Luke in the confession room, especially to his father that he had not been seen for 11 years.
 Day 202: Hiroshi Aruelo, the winner of Kuya's Task Master campaign on Kumu, appeared virtually to explain the Plate Balancing weekly task to the Teen housemates.
 Day 204: Paz Blackburn and Nelflor Jordan, Rob and Stephanie's respective mothers, appeared virtually to have one-on-one chat with Rob and Stephanie as a reward for completing the How Well Do You Know Each Other task.

Physical Guesting 
 Day 178: Paz Blackburn and Ana Marie Lim, Rob and Ashton's respective mothers, were invited inside as they were to see Rob and Ashton separately as part of their secret tasks. Prior to this, the mothers were given a task and helped Eslam and Stef in their secret task for the two boys. Rob was able to spend time with Paz with a fine dining dinner date, while Ashton had the same with Ana Marie with a picnic table date.
 Day 186: JC Alcantara entered the house to perform tasks with Tour Group members before reuniting with brother Paolo in the Museum Group. Bonifacio "Tatay Dennis" Alcantara, Paolo's father, joined JC and the Tour Group as they enter the Museo ni Kuya witnessing the Museum Group recreate Paolo's family picture in their human diorama challenge with JC joining in, and reunite with Paolo for a brief period.
 Day 194: P-pop groups MNL48 (Coleen, Ella, and Jem) and SB19 entered the house as mentors to teach the housemates in singing and dancing choreography in preparation for the upcoming The Big KumuniTEEN Summer Concert weekly task. SB19 would go on to stay inside the house and be with the housemates in the coming days until the time of their concert, while MNL48 exited the house the same day after their entrance.
 Day 196: Elizabeth El Gohari, Eslam's mother, entered the house to celebrate Eslam's birthday celebration and reunited with him along with the other housemates and SB19 for a brief period of time.
 Day 204: Evelyn Alcantara, Flora Mae Trinidad, Jessica Ronato, Marianne Mayores, and Rosalinda Skribikin, the respective mothers of Paolo, Maxine, Tiff, Dustine, and Gabb, entered the house to help the housemates in cleaning the house while wearing PPEs before eventually reuniting with the housemates to celebrate Mother's Day inside the house.

Tasks

Weekly tasks

Notes

  The teen housemates have only collected nine stars at the end of the weekly task. Therefore, they have failed and were not given their weekly budget.
  As suggested by Big Brother himself, Don was exempt from performing due to his health condition.
  The housemates made four mistakes while performing the weekly task. They were made by Rob and Tiff with one mistake each, and Maxine with two mistakes; therefore, they were not given their weekly budget again.
  The housemates only received 50% of their weekly budget for the week as the task leaders, Dustine and Maxine, traded the other 50% for an extra advantage on the last 15 minutes of their weekly task as said by Big Brother.
  Kai was in the house when the task was performed. The episode for this task was aired on April 11, 2022, one day after the second eviction night.
  As punishment, the housemates must construct the remaining unclaimed musical instrument by themselves.
  Maxine still received her reward even though the housemates failed to shoot the 7 remaining targets required to complete the task. The housemates would have to construct and paint the stage by themselves as another punishment for failing the challenge.
  As task leader, Paolo was excluded for this challenge to act as their lookout for the challenge along with the other members of SB19.
  This weekly task must be completed by the housemates in 24 hours after the housemates voted for "a weekly task valid for a day" in the voting asked by Big Brother.

Other tasks

Notes

Teens
  The teen housemates scored 0 points as they removed 4 white and black slippers during the game.
  Eslam and Luke were in the house before they were both evicted that same night. Team 2 won this game and was rewarded a halo-halo by Big Brother.

K.E.A's tasks
K.E.A (short for Kuya's Executive Assistant) was introduced to the Teen housemates before Big Brother temporarily left the House shortly on Week 24. Unbeknownst to the Teen housemates, K.E.A was "hacked" by a "scammer" days later when a power outage occurred in the house. The "scammer" K.E.A then lured the housemates into giving them a reward for every secret reward task they complete. This gave the Teen housemates and the viewers a valuable lesson regarding on rising cases of social media fraud in the Philippines.

Challenges

Head of Household

Notes

Teens
 Stef participated in this challenge before being evicted on the same night. Should Stef be saved from eviction, then she would be automatically assigned to the Museum Group for the then-upcoming Past is Past weekly task.
 No Padaluck recipient and campaign was held on Kumu for this challenge to ensure fairness for all the housemates.

Group challenges

The Ten Million Diamonds Challenge

The Ten Million Diamonds Group Challenge
A special variation of the challenge was featured during the Teen edition featured the Teen housemates competing against a group of Teen houseplayers to gain a portion of the ten million diamonds given by Big Brother. They must defend their diamonds against the houseplayers to earn a bigger portion of the diamonds.

Final Five spot challenges

Nomination history
In each standard nomination round, every housemate is called to the confession room to nominate two of their housemates for eviction with the first nominee receiving 2 points and the other receiving 1 point. The housemates with the most nomination points (usually 3) will then face the public vote to determine the evictee for that round. However, Big Brother may automatically nominate a housemate for rule violations or a failure in a task. On the other hand, immunity may be awarded as a reward for accomplishing a task. Big Brother may forcibly evict a housemate for severe violations and a housemate may opt to voluntarily leave the house. In certain circumstances, the nomination process may be delayed as a result of a pending challenge or task.

Legend
  Housemate received immunity after becoming a Head of Household.
  Housemate received immunity after winning or finishing a task or challenge
  Housemate was automatically nominated as a result of a loss in a challenge.

Notes

   For winning the PBB University group challenge, Team Luke, consisting of its namesake, Ashton, Eslam, Gabb, Maxine, and Tiff were awarded immunity for the week. On the other hand, Team Dustine, consisting of its namesake, Paolo, Rob, Stef, and Stephanie decided that week's nominees.
  For this week, the housemates had a face to face nomination unlike the previous nomination rounds.
  Gabb gave her Nomination Immunity Pass to Paolo, giving him immunity for this week's nomination.
  Maxine and Rob won immunity after winning the most Vote to Save face-to-face nomination.
  This eviction is a double eviction wherein two nominees are set to be evicted.
  Paolo and Gabb secured their first two Final Five slot after defending their spot to Tiff and Dustine, the challengers.
  Rob and Gabb did not leave the house. They will be joined by the Top 2 of each batch. 
  Stephanie and Maxine did not leave on Day 210. As the next two highest voters, they were the comeback housemates in the teen batch.

Powers 
On Day 162, Gabb was awarded a Nomination Immunity Pass for having the most number of followers among her fellow housemates during their Follower Sprint task that was held from March 22 to 25, 2022. On the fifth round of nominations, Gabb gave her Nomination Immunity Pass to Paolo, guaranteeing him another week in the house by giving himself immunity.

Special Nomination Processes 
Prior to the fifth nominations, the housemates observed two special nomination processes which granted immunity to the winners of each process.

Yellow Discs 
For this process, each housemate is given five yellow discs, each representing a positive nomination point. A housemate may choose to award each disc to a housemate of their choice (including themselves) by shooting each disc into that particular housemate's container. A point will be considered valid should its corresponding disc land on their intended container, otherwise it would be invalidated.

The housemate(s) with the highest number of discs inserted in their respective containers will then be granted immunity from that week's nomination. The remaining housemates will then move to another round of nomination. As Ashton was evicted from the house prior to the nominations, any points he had received were invalidated.

Legend
 Housemate successfully shoots the disc in the chosen housemates' container.
 Housemate failed to shoot the disc in the chosen housemates' container.
Underlined name denotes a vote intended to be cast for oneself.

Red Discs 
Following Ashton's eviction, the housemates had their fifth nominations, in which each housemate's nominations were cast publicly. In this process, each housemate is given three red discs, each representing a nomination point. Each housemate, including those made immune by the Yellow Disc challenge were obligated to nominate two housemates by placing discs on the housemates they chose to nominate for eviction, with the first nominee receiving two discs and the second receiving one disc. The housemates with the least discs would be saved from nominations, with the rest being nominated for that week.

Kumunity beneficiaries 
 Girls Got Game Philippines, Inc. — The teen housemates were informed that they have the chance to help a Kumunity in need, and the Girls Got Game Philippines, Inc. will be the said Kumunity in need of help. The outcome of their Body Photo Mosaic Making weekly task wherein they must successfully mimic a photo mosaic with 324 different pieces of photographs will determine the amount to be given to this Kumunity. As of this date, the amount given by Big Brother and the housemates to this Kumunity was not revealed, nor was posted in each of their social media accounts.
 Bantay Bata: Children's Village — Big Brother revealed on Day 191 that the Bantay Bata: Children's Village will be the next Kumunity in need. To determine the outcome and basis of the donation that Big Brother will donate to this Kumunity, the housemates were given the Big KumuniTEEN Summer Concert weekly task wherein the housemates must create a summer-themed concert throughout the week. The housemates must earn at least 250 diamonds after all of their performances. Big Brother and the housemates donated one hundred thousand pesos (₱100,000) to this Kumunity after the Teen housemates successfully completed the said weekly task.
Another charity task for the same beneficiary was given to the Biga-10 housemates. Named the Biga-10 Bayanihan para sa Bantay Bata, the housemates of three Kumunities were tasked to create a 5-minute superhero-themed play. They must assign one housemate as their brand ambassador/ambassadress of the beneficiary. The public will then select a housemate to become the face of the said beneficiary. The hero's assigned Kumunity that has the highest number of virtual gifts at the end of the livestream on Kumu will become the said ambassador.
 Sinag Kalinga Foundation, Inc. — A beneficiary that houses aged people that do not have a permanent home, this Kumunity beneficiary is the last that they will be giving help for this edition. The housemates were given their last weekly task named the Paper Tower of Tibay where they must make a paper tower that is 7-foot tall. They must make sure that the tower they have made will be sturdy when three heavy diamonds are placed for 100 seconds. The Teen housemates successfully completed the said weekly task but Big Brother did not announce on how much did he donated for this beneficiary during the episodes' broadcast.

S-E voting system result

Controversies and criticisms

Inappropriate remarks
Stephanie Jordan called out Rob Blackburn for allegedly shouting at fellow housemate Kai Espenido as he was participating in K.E.A.'s punishment task, saying "Rob, next time you don't shout because di niya kasalanan 'to, ang sama ng ugali mo Rob!" ("Rob, next time you don't shout because it's not her fault, your attitude is bad Rob!") after Blackburn said "You should be!" to Espenido in an aggravated tone which caused the latter to cry. Jordan reiterated the events outside to Gabb Skribikin and Stef Draper, who were working on their weekly task inside. Jordan went back outside for a while, but quickly went inside again after Skribikin and Maxine Trinidad calmed her down, and Tiff Ronato restrained her from going outside in order for Blackburn to not feel any more pressure. Espenido was still crying when she came back, and Draper said that "it was the third time he (Blackburn) shouted to girls", in which Jordan responded "Di yan pwede guys, di yan pwede! Kahit anong gagawin mo, hindi ka pwede sumigaw sa tao na walang dahilan! Di tayo pwede maging soft sa lalaki na walang utak na ginagamit!" ("That's not allowed guys, that's not allowed! Whatever you do, you can't shout at someone without a reason! We can't be soft to boys that don't use their brains!"), which earned a mixed reaction from viewers. Some praised her for being frank and unfiltered, while others criticized her for the words she used and for being insensitive towards Blackburn, who had told Draper and Trinidad in an earlier episode about trauma he had from being a victim of bullying by his classmates. Blackburn apologized to Espenido the day after the incident. This was a primary factor that caused Jordan to garner a lot of BBEs in succeeding evictions.

During the fifth round of nominations, Gabb Skribikin gave 2 points to Stephanie Jordan, citing that she hasn't been evicted from the first nomination up to that point, and Skribikin wanted to see "how much can she (Jordan) go". As a result, Skribikin was heavily criticized online for being insensitive towards Jordan, who was nominated for the fifth straight time alongside Skribikin, who herself was nominated for the first time, with many bringing up her widely panned "MaJoHa", "SLEX", and "Sultan Kudarat" blunders during their History Picture Quiz Bee challenge. Both Jordan and Skribikin were saved from eviction by the end of the week, with Jordan topping the polls after 4 consecutive second-to-last finishes.

Housemates' performance on quiz bee
Gabb Skribikin and Kai Espenido were widely criticized across social media platforms for incorrectly answering a question about the collective nickname of three Filipino priests executed during the Spanish colonial period, namely Mariano Gomez, Jose Burgos, and Jacinto Zamora, known as Gomburza, during their History Quiz Bee. Espenido answered "MarJo", while Skribikin answered "MaJoHa". The latter was also criticized for answering "SLEX" to a question about the San Juanico Bridge. Viewers said that the incorrect answers of both Espenido and Skribikin are a symptom of the Philippines' poor education system, and others called for the Department of Education (DepEd) to "open the schools" online. Because of this, Big Brother decided to refreshen the teen housemates' knowledge in Philippine history by giving them quizzes in the form of a Head of Household challenge along with an examination weekly task that was given to them in the following week, though Espenido was already evicted a week prior, thus she didn't participate in the History Week.

Host Robi Domingo, who asked the history questions to the housemates, expressed his disappointment on Twitter a few days after the history quiz bee trended across social media, saying

References

Kumunity season 10 teen edition
2022 Philippine television seasons